Bill Baxter may refer to:
 Bill Baxter (Victorian politician) (born 1946), Australian politician
 Bill Baxter (Queensland politician) (1907–1978), member of the Queensland Legislative Assembly
 Bill Baxter (band) (founded 1982), French band
 Bill Baxter (Scottish footballer) (1924–2002), Scottish footballer
 Bill Baxter (Australian footballer) (1919–1983), Australian footballer

See also
 Billy Baxter (disambiguation)
 William Baxter (disambiguation)

Baxter, Bill